Wecyclers is a waste management company in Nigeria that helps low-income communities exchange their recyclable waste which is measured in kilograms for cash and other rewards.

History 
The waste management company Wecyclers began as a student project in respect to this, Bilikiss Adebiyi-Abiola has now modified it into a social enterprise that combats Lagos' garbage crisis and encourages low-income communities to turn refuse into revenue.

In 2012, Wecyclers was founded by Bilikiss Adebiyi-Abiola and her co-founders. Wecyclers uses low-cost cargo bicycles to provide convenient recycling services to households across Nigeria.

Partnership 
Wecyclers is in partnership with various organizations which includes; Nestle Nigeria, Guinness Nigeria and Lagos State Waste Management Authority.

Awards and recognition 

 Le Monde Smart-Cities 2017 Innovation Awards.
 The Tech Intel Environmental Awards 2013.
 2019 King Baudouin Award.

References 

Waste companies
2012 establishments in Nigeria